Gregory Jerome Coleman (born September 9, 1954) is a former American football punter who had a 12-year career in the National Football League playing for the Cleveland Browns, the Minnesota Vikings, and the Washington Redskins.  He attended Florida A&M University.  Coleman is a member of Alpha Phi Alpha fraternity

Coleman was the Minnesota Vikings sideline reporter for KFAN, until the end of the  2021 season. He is the cousin of former Major League Baseball outfielder Vince Coleman. Early in his career, he earned the nickname "Coffin Corner" because of his ability to aim his kicks near the corner of the playing field where the end zone and out-of-bounds lines meet. Due to his uncharacteristic speed (for a punter) defenses often lined up to guard against a fake punt because he was a threat to run for a first down.

He is known as being one of the first African American Punters in the NFL. He was selected by the fans to be a member of the Viking 40th Anniversary team. He is a member of the Florida A&M Football Hall of Fame  and is also a member of the State of Florida Track and Field Hall of Fame.

References

External links
KFAN Vikings Broadcast Team

1954 births
Living people
Players of American football from Jacksonville, Florida
American football punters
Florida A&M Rattlers football players
Cleveland Browns players
Minnesota Vikings players
Washington Redskins players
National Football League announcers